The Ministry of National Heritage is the Sri Lankan government ministry responsible for “Identifying and preserving national heritages in Sri Lanka towards the prosperity of our nation and thereby promoting such heritages.”

List of ministers 

The Minister of National Heritage is an appointment in the Cabinet of Sri Lanka.

Parties

See also 
 List of ministries of Sri Lanka

References

External links 
 Ministry of National Heritage
 Government of Sri Lanka

National Heritage
National Heritage